"My Old Piano" is a song by American R&B singer Diana Ross. It was written and produced by Chic members Nile Rodgers and Bernard Edwards for her self-titled tenth studio album (1980). In it, Ross sings about the joy of playing a piano, describing it as if it were a person. The song was released on September 19, 1980 as the album's third and final single by Motown Records in the United States, and the second single elsewhere. In an accompanying music video, Ross appears performing the song in an apartment with an old piano.

Unlike previous singles "Upside Down" and "I'm Coming Out", "My Old Piano" was not as successful in the United States (as it was issued as a single nearly two years after the album's release, by which time Ross had departed Motown Records); however, it was a commercial success in Europe, particularly in the United Kingdom, where it was a Top 10 hit and earned her a British Phonographic Industry (BPI) silver disc award for sales in excess of 250,000 copies.

Track listings

7" Single
 
 "My Old Piano"    3:55  
 "Where Did We Go Wrong"  3:59

12" Single

 "My Old Piano"    3:55
 "Where Did We Go Wrong"  3:59  
 "Now That You're Gone" 3:59

Charts

Weekly charts

Year-end charts

Certifications

References

1980 songs
1980 singles
Diana Ross songs
Disco songs
Songs written by Nile Rodgers
Songs written by Bernard Edwards
Song recordings produced by Nile Rodgers
Song recordings produced by Bernard Edwards
Motown singles